North Manheim Township is a township in Schuylkill County, Pennsylvania, United States. The population was 4,043 at the 2020 census. It was created in 1845 by dividing Manheim Township into South Manheim and North Manheim Townships.

North Manheim was the location of the first canal tunnel in America, built for the Schuylkill Navigation Company.

Geography
According to the United States Census Bureau, the township has a total area of 20.6 square miles (53.3 km), of which 20.5 square miles (53.0 km)  is land and 0.1 square mile (0.2 km)  (0.44%) is water.

Demographics

At the 2000 census there were 3,287 people, 1,255 households, and 901 families living in the township.  The population density was 160.6 people per square mile (62.0/km).  There were 1,339 housing units at an average density of 65.4/sq mi (25.3/km).  The racial makeup of the township was 98.24% White, 0.55% African American, 0.18% Native American, 0.55% Asian, 0.09% from other races, and 0.40% from two or more races. Hispanic or Latino of any race were 0.49%.

Of the 1,255 households 31.2% had children under the age of 18 living with them, 60.9% were married couples living together, 6.6% had a female householder with no husband present, and 28.2% were non-families. 23.3% of households were one person and 10.8% were one person aged 65 or older.  The average household size was 2.49 and the average family size was 2.94.

The age distribution was 22.1% under the age of 18, 6.6% from 18 to 24, 27.9% from 25 to 44, 25.0% from 45 to 64, and 18.4% 65 or older.  The median age was 41 years. For every 100 females, there were 98.4 males.  For every 100 females age 18 and over, there were 98.1 males.

The median household income was $40,464 and the median family income  was $51,250. Males had a median income of $37,827 versus $19,875 for females. The per capita income for the township was $19,683.  About 3.9% of families and 7.1% of the population were below the poverty line, including 4.9% of those under age 18 and 6.8% of those age 65 or over.

Gallery

References 

Townships in Schuylkill County, Pennsylvania
Townships in Pennsylvania